is a three volume manga series written and illustrated by Motofumi Kobayashi. It was published in North America and the United Kingdom (printed in Canada) in 2004 by ADV Manga. It was also released in Poland in 2006, also under the title Cat Shit One. It has been released in France, Belgium and Spain, as Cat Shit One, by Glénat in 2006.

In 2008 Kobayashi released a follow-up to Cat Shit One – Cat Shit One 80. Currently four volumes have been published in Japan.

A computer-generated original net animation series of Cat Shit One by Studio Anima began release on IDA Entertainment's YouTube channel in Japan from July 17, 2010, and in North America, Australia and New Zealand on February 5, 2011. The animated version is set in the Middle East rather than Vietnam, and a trailer indicates that the action takes place after 1991.

Plot
The manga follows three American soldiers (who are anthropomorphic animals) in the Vietnam War named Botasky, Perky and Rats. All three are in the recon team called "Cat Shit One". Each mission (or chapter) shows the daily activities of the reconnaissance group in Vietnam. There are sections of the manga which give brief history and truths behind the war, such as the types of weapons used by different countries and the activities of forces in the war. At the end of volume one there is a chapter called "Dog Shit One"—separate from the main story—showing human characters.

In Cat Shit One '80, the story continues to follow the three main protagonists as they became involved in various low-intensity conflicts in the 1980s. Perky, now a member of the elite Delta Force, was attached to the Special Air Service and was involved in various SAS operations while Rats and Bota were involved with the US operation in Afghanistan against the Soviet invasion.

An animated adaptation of Cat Shit One was released in 2010; however, it follows the Cat Shit One '80 storyline.

Character depiction
The manga depicts the characters as different animals according to their nationality as follows:
American – rabbit (from the Japanese word for rabbit: Usagi ("うさぎ"): USA G.I.)
Vietnamese – Siamese cat
French – domestic pig (from pigs used to hunt truffles)
Chinese – panda
Japanese – Japanese macaque and gorilla
Russian – brown bear
Korean – nureongi (from the dog dish bosintang)
British – rat (from The Desert Rats)
Australian – kangaroo and koala

The following are new animals depicted in Cat Shit One '80:
German – Fennec fox (from Desert Fox)
Middle Eastern and Pakistan – goat and sheep
Afghan - camel
Latin Americans – cow

Main characters
Sergeant Perkins (aka Perky) 
 An American fuzzy lop soldier and leader of the Cat Shit One recon team, later receiving the rank of Captain.  In Cat Shit One '80, Perky, now a major, continues to serve in the Army under Beck with the newly formed Delta Force.  He is attached to the British Special Air Service under the command of Sir Michael Rose as the American exchange officer and develops a close personal and professional relationship with GSG 9 commander Ulrich Wegener and GIGN commander Christian Prouteau.  Perky is heavily involved in the SAS operations during the Iranian Embassy Siege and the Falklands War.
Sergeant White (aka Rats)
 A Netherland Dwarf rabbit soldier, sniper, and interpreter of English and Vietnamese.  Rats, who was born in the Bronx, comes from a humble background and is sympathetic to the plight of those displaced by the war.  In Cat Shit One '80, Rats is recruited into the CIA and was sent to Afghanistan to serve as liaison and military advisor for General Massoud and the Mujahideen under his command against the Soviet forces.
Botasky (aka Bota) 
 A Dutch rabbit soldier and the radio operator for the group. In the story he is often portrayed as cowardly and racist.  After the war, Botasky made a fortune selling fast food and became the chairman of a multinational fast food chain.  In Cat Shit One '80, Botasky begins to expand his business to the Asian market and uses his influence with the Chinese government to smuggle Chinese-made weapons into Afghanistan to Rats and Massoud's Mujahideens.
Chico
 A Montagnard (or "Yard") trained by the Americans. He is featured frequently in the story, often bailing Cat Shit One out of jams.
Beckwith
 Major Charlie Beckwith, the commander for the Special Force Detachment B-52, is in charge of the recon team operations.  Cat Shit One always receives their orders directly from Beckwith himself.  In Cat Shit One '80, Beckwith becomes the commander of Delta Force and is forced to retire due to the failure of Operation Eagle Claw.
Misha
 Introduced in Cat Shit One '80.  Misha is a young brown bear that is an inexperienced Soviet VDV second lieutenant sent to Afghanistan to reinforce the Soviet forces in the region.  His position was under heavy suicide attack by the Taliban, and he was rescued by Perky and a small SAS detachment.  Due to his bravery, he was assigned to a Spetsnaz unit.  It is later revealed that Misha is the son of a high-ranking KGB general.

Media

Manga

Anime
A CG animated ONA adaptation of Cat Shit One was developed by IDA Entertainment. So far, only one episode has been released on Japan's YouTube channel on July 17, 2010, with plans for a 12-episode series currently in production, but , no further news about this sequel was published. An English dub was released on YouTube on February 5, 2011, and will be independently distributed on DVD and Blu-ray Disc via Amazon in North America. In December 2022, a Kickstarter was launched for a DVD/Blu-Ray/3D Blu-ray set. However the Kickstarter failed to accomplish its goal as it made US$17,350 (approximately 2,246,447 yen) out of its US$77,227 (10,000,000 yen).

Reception
The recent Cat Shit One adaptation was nominated for Outstanding Achievement in an Animated Short category in the 9th Annual VES Awards.

Notes 
For the US release, it was retitled as Apocalypse Meow to parody the title of the film Apocalypse Now, which also took place during the Vietnam War.

References

External links
 
 
IDA Entertainment's Youtube Channel

1998 manga
2010 anime ONAs
ADV Manga
Comics set during the Cold War
Comics about animals
Comics about rabbits and hares
Comics about cats
Comics about dogs
Comics about bears
Comics about monkeys
Comics about mice and rats
Comics set during the Vietnam War
Comics characters introduced in 1998
Manga series
Seinen manga
Vietnam War books
Vietnam War fiction